Matthew Ryan Oberst Jr. (January 3, 1974 – November 27, 2016) was an American musician who was front man of the indie rock band Sorry About Dresden.

Background 
He was born in Omaha, Nebraska. He was the son of Nancy and Matthew Ryan Oberst. His youngest brother is singer-songwriter Conor Oberst of Bright Eyes. He graduated from Creighton Preparatory School and Creighton University.

Career 
Living in North Carolina, Oberst found another Nebraska transplant, Matt Tomich, and the duo started Sorry About Dresden with Eric Roehrig and James Hepler in Chapel Hill in 1996. He did creative and production work with Bright Eyes albums and other albums released by Saddle Creek Records.

Personal 
Oberst was an English teacher at Sterling Montessori School. He had two children, John and Annabelle.

In 2016, he died in his home in Cary, North Carolina at the age of 42.

References

1970s births
2016 deaths

Musicians from Omaha, Nebraska
Musicians from North Carolina
People from Cary, North Carolina
Creighton University alumni